Uromastyx is a genus of African and Asian agamid lizards, the member species of which are commonly called spiny-tailed lizards, uromastyces, mastigures, or dabb lizards. Lizards in the genus Uromastyx are primarily herbivorous, but occasionally eat insects and other small animals, especially young lizards. They spend most of their waking hours basking in the sun, hiding in underground chambers at daytime, or when danger appears.  They tend to establish themselves in hilly, rocky areas with good shelter and accessible vegetation.

Taxonomy

The generic name (Uromastyx) is derived from the Ancient Greek words ourá (οὐρά) meaning "tail" and -mastix (μάστιξ) meaning "whip" or "scourge", after the thick-spiked tail characteristic of all Uromastyx species.

Species

The following species are in the genus Uromastyx. Three additional species were formerly placed in this genus, but have been moved to their own genus, Saara.

Description
Like many reptiles, these lizards' colors change according to the temperature and season; during cool weather they appear dull and dark but the colors become lighter in warm weather, especially when basking; the darker pigmentation allows their skin to absorb sunlight more effectively.

Their spiked tail is muscular and heavy, and is able to be swung at an attacker with great velocity, usually accompanied by hissing and an open-mouthed display of (small) teeth. Uromastyx generally sleep in their burrows with their tails closest to the opening, in order to thwart intruders.

Distribution
Uromastyx inhabit a range stretching through most of North and Northeast Africa, the Middle East, ranging as far east as Iran. Species found further east are now placed in the genus Saara. They are regularly eaten, and sold in produce markets, by local peoples.

Diet
These lizards acquire most of the water they need from the vegetation they ingest. In the wild they generally eat any surrounding vegetation. When hatching, baby uromastyx eat their own mother's feces as their first meal before heading off to find a more sustainable food source. They do this to establish a proper gut flora, essential for digesting the plants that they eat.

In the wild, adult Malis have been reported to eat insects at certain times of the year, when it is hot and their only food source available would be insects.

Reproduction
A female Uromastyx can lay anywhere from 5 to 40 eggs, depending on age and species.  Eggs are laid approximately 30 days following copulation with an incubation time of 70–80 days.  The neonates weigh  and are about  snout to vent length.  They rapidly gain weight during the first few weeks following hatching.

Wild female uromastyx are smaller and less colorful than males.  For example, U. (dispar) maliensis females are often light tan with black dorsal spots, while males are mostly bright yellow with mottled black markings.  Females also tend to have shorter claws. In captivity female U. (dispar) maliensis tend to mimic males in color. Maliensis are, therefore, reputably difficult to breed in captivity.

Consumption by humans
Uromastyx maliensis, known as "ḍabb" by peninsular Arabs, is historically consumed as food by some of the bedouin population of the Arabian peninsula, mainly those residing in the interior and eastern regions of Arabia. This lizard used to be considered an "arabian delicacy". It is recorded that when an Uromastyx was brought to the Islamic prophet Muhammad by Bedouins, Muhammad did not eat the lizard but Muslims were not prohibited by him from consuming it; thus Muhammad's companion Khalid bin Walid consumed the lizard.

In Judaism, this lizard is traditionally identified as the biblical tzav, one of the 8 "creeping" animals forbidden for consumption that impart ritual impurity. The Torah states: “The following shall be impure for you among the creeping animals that swarm upon the earth: The weasel, and the mouse, and the dab lizard (tzav) of every variety; and the gecko, and the land-crocodile, and the lizard, and the skink, and the chameleon” (Leviticus 11:29-30).

Captivity
Uromastyx are removed from the wild in an unregulated manner for the pet and medicinal trade in Morocco, despite their protected status in the country; conditions of the animals while being sold is often extremely poor and overcrowding is common. Historically, captive Uromastyx had a poor survival rate, due to a lack of understanding of their dietary and environmental needs. In recent years, knowledge has significantly increased, and appropriate diet and care has led to survival rates and longevity approaching and perhaps surpassing those in the wild. With good care, they are capable of living for over 25 years, and possibly as old as 60.

See also
Animals in Islam

References

External links

 Information on some Uromastyx species
 A digital library source from the University of Texas at Austin
 Detailed Uromastyx Care Sheet
 Uromastyx.eu
 Dr. Doug Dix Uromastyx Page
 The UroWiki

 
Reptiles of Africa
Reptiles of the Middle East
Lizard genera
Taxa named by Blasius Merrem
Reptiles as pets